Tegula corteziana is a species of sea snail, a marine gastropod mollusk in the family Tegulidae.

Description
The height  of this gray-brown shell attains 10.5 mm, its diameter 12.4 mm.

Distribution
This species occurs in the Pacific Ocean off Mexico.

References

External links
 To GenBank (2 nucleotides; 1 proteins)
 To USNM Invertebrate Zoology Mollusca Collection
 To World Register of Marine Species
 

corteziana
Gastropods described in 1970